Mohammad Abu Saeed Khan is a Bangladesh Nationalist Party politician and the former Member of Parliament of Kushtia-8.

Career
Khan was elected to parliament from Kushtia-8 as a Bangladesh Nationalist Party candidate in 1979.

References

Bangladesh Nationalist Party politicians
Living people
2nd Jatiya Sangsad members
Year of birth missing (living people)